Lisette Alexís Gutiérrez, (born April 16, 1999) known professionally as Lisette Alexis and Lisette Olivera, is an American actress. She is best known for her role in the Disney+ television series National Treasure: Edge of History, the 2022 extension of the National Treasure franchise.

Life
Lisette Alexís Gutiérrez's parents were born in Mexico, and she is of Mexican descent through multiple generations. She was born in the US on April 16, 1999, and grew up in the suburbs of Los Angeles, partly brought up by her grandfather. Her mother dissuaded her from a career in acting, pushing her towards more "economically sufficient" areas, and she instead trained as a dancer from childhood, and also studied vocals, piano and guitar. When she was old enough to drive herself, she auditioned for short films in nearby Hollywood. She modelled in college.

Career
Billed originally as Lisette Alexis, she has performed professionally in several films and two series.  Her screen acting career began with the short film Feint, released in 2019, the year in which she was also featured in a season of the Brat TV teen drama web series Total Eclipse. Subsequently, she played a role in the psychological horror film We Need to Do Something and took significant roles in two short films.

After detailed summer 2021 auditions, Olivera was announced in the lead role for the National Treasure series, billed as Lisette Alexis, in October 2021, ahead of the rest of the cast. She later released the first word, in a "behind the scenes" post, about commencement of filming. Later references, and screen credits, list her as Lisette Olivera. The series was the first new media release in the National Treasure franchise in around 15 years, with a production budget of around 80 million dollars.  Olivera’s character, Jess Valenzuela (originally planned as "Jess Morales"), is a 22-year-old aspirant cryptologist and Latina DREAMer. Co-stars include Catherine Zeta-Jones and Harvey Keitel, and she has mentioned that she learned a lot from, and was mentored by, Zeta-Jones. 

Olivera’s performance garnered positive reviews, including from CBR, which stated that "her talent is far more deserving of the big screen than a streaming series. It's clear that she could handle sharing equal billing with Nicolas Cage in National Treasure 3", and Yahoo! Entertainment, which described her as "earnest and charming".

Filmography

Film

TV and web TV

References

Footnotes

External links
 
 Official Instagram
 
 

1999 births
Actresses from Los Angeles
American film actresses
American television actresses
American actresses of Mexican descent
21st-century American actresses
Living people